Alejandra Frances Montaño Heredia (born 7 April 1987) is a Bolivian footballer who plays as a defender. She has been a member of the Bolivia women's national team.

Early life
Montaño hails from the Cochabamba Department.

International career
Montaño played for Bolivia at senior level in two Copa América Femenina editions (2010 and 2014).

References

1987 births
Living people
Women's association football defenders
Women's association football midfielders
Bolivian women's footballers
People from Cochabamba Department
Bolivia women's international footballers
Club Aurora players